Martine is a feminine given name and a surname. 

Martine may also refer to:

 Mount Martine, Palmer Land, Antarctica
 Martine, a 1922 play by Jean-Jacques Bernard
 Martine (film), a 1961 Australian television play based on Bernard's play